Jeremiah Lamenting the Destruction of Jerusalem is a 1630 painting by Rembrandt. It is one of the most renowned works of his Leiden period.

Reception
Several art critics have praised Jeremiah Lamenting the Destruction of Jerusalem as one of Rembrandt's early masterpieces.

References

Paintings by Rembrandt
1630s in art
Paintings in the collection of the Rijksmuseum
Paintings depicting Hebrew Bible prophets
Jeremiah